

Historical or architectural interest bridges

Major bridges 

See also 

 Transport in Venezuela
 Rail transport in Venezuela
 Geography of Venezuela
 List of rivers of Venezuela
 :es:Carreteras de Venezuela  - Roads in Venezuela

References 
 Notes

 Nicolas Janberg, Structurae.com, International Database for Civil and Structural Engineering

 Others references

Further reading

External links 

 
 

Venezuela

Bridges
b